The Louisiana–Louisiana Tech football rivalry is an inactive American college football rivalry between the Louisiana Tech Bulldogs and the Louisiana Ragin' Cajuns (formerly the Southwestern Louisiana Ragin' Cajuns, and known since the 2017–18 school year as the Louisiana Ragin' Cajuns). The two teams have met 87 times on the football field, with Louisiana Tech currently holding a 48–33–6 lead in the all-time series. After a handful of early meetings, they played virtually every year from 1924 to 2000. The yearly game ended following the Bulldogs' transition to the Western Athletic Conference and the Ragin' Cajuns' to the Sun Belt Conference. They have met four times since, and continue to play each other in other sports.

History
The first meeting came in 1910, while both were independent. They were members of the Louisiana Intercollegiate Athletic Association from 1914–1925 and played off and on during that time span. They would remain conference mates through several conferences, namely the Southern Intercollegiate Athletic Association (1926–1941), the Louisiana Intercollegiate Conference (1941–1947), the Gulf States Conference (1948–1970), and the Southland Conference (1971–1981). They played every year of that span dating back to 1924 (with the exception of 1943 due to WWII). This also saw them transition from College Division/Division II to Division I/Division I-A.

In 1982, the Southland Conference downgraded to I-AA. Louisiana Tech remained with the conference, but then-Southwestern Louisiana left the conference to become a Division I-A independent. Louisiana Tech would ultimately leave the Southland to compete as an independent themselves, first in Division I-AA (1987–88) and later Division I-A like Southwestern starting in 1989. Despite being in different divisions, they continued to play every year (except 1987). They remained independent in football until both joined the Big West Conference for football only for a three-year period from 1993–1995. Afterwards they both resumed independence through 2000.

In 2000, La Tech defeated newly renamed Louisiana–Lafayette 48–14. This would be the end of the annual series that had been played for 76 years. Following the 2000 season, Louisiana Tech became a member of the Western Athletic Conference, while Louisiana–Lafayette became a member of the Sun Belt Conference. They would meet again in 2003–2004. In 2013, Louisiana Tech left the WAC and joined Conference USA, and the two met again in 2014–2015. Louisiana Tech won all four games, extending a win streak starting in 1997. The teams are scheduled to meet in a home-and-home series in 2026 and 2029.

Game results

Notes:

See also  
 List of NCAA college football rivalry games

References

College football rivalries in the United States
Louisiana Ragin' Cajuns football
Louisiana Tech Bulldogs football
1910 establishments in Louisiana